Millthorpe may refer to:
Millthorpe, Derbyshire, England
Millthorpe, Lincolnshire, England
Millthorpe, New South Wales, Australia